Svein Inge Valvik (born 20 September 1956) is a retired Norwegian discus thrower. He represented SK Vidar, IF Kamp-Vestheim, IK Tjalve, Stabæk IF and Urædd.

He finished seventh in the discus final at the 1994 European Championships with a throw of 62.02 metres. He competed at the 1988 and 1996 Summer Olympics as well as the World Championships in 1987, 1991 and 1995 without reaching the final. He became Norwegian champion in discus throw in the years 1977, 1985 and 1990-1996.

His personal best throw was 68.00 metres, achieved in May 1982 in Juárez. This makes him the second best discus thrower in Norwegian history after Knut Hjeltnes.

He currently works as a teacher at Porsgrunn Videregående Skole.

Achievements

References

External links

1956 births
Living people
Norwegian male discus throwers
Athletes (track and field) at the 1988 Summer Olympics
Athletes (track and field) at the 1996 Summer Olympics
Olympic athletes of Norway
UTEP Miners men's track and field athletes